Clostridioides difficile (syn. Clostridium difficile) is a bacterium that is well known for causing serious diarrheal infections, and may also cause colon cancer. Also known as C. difficile, or C. diff,  is  Gram-positive species of spore-forming bacteria. Clostridioides spp. are anaerobic, motile bacteria, ubiquitous in nature and especially prevalent in soil. Its vegetative cells are rod-shaped, pleomorphic, and occur in pairs or short chains. Under the microscope, they appear as long, irregular (often drumstick- or spindle-shaped) cells with a bulge at their terminal ends (forms subterminal spores). Under Gram staining, C. difficile cells are Gram-positive and show optimum growth on blood agar at human body temperatures in the absence of oxygen. C. difficile is catalase- and superoxide dismutase-negative, and produces up to three types of toxins: enterotoxin A, cytotoxin B and Clostridioides difficile transferase (CDT).  Under stress conditions, the bacteria produce spores that are able to tolerate extreme conditions that the active bacteria cannot tolerate.

Clostridioides difficile is an important emerging human pathogen; according to the CDC, in 2017 there were 223,900 cases in hospitalized patients and 12,800 deaths in the United States. Although C. difficile  is commonly known as a hospital and antibiotic associated pathogen, at most one third of infections can be traced to transmission from an infected person in hospitals, and only a small number of antibiotics are directly associated with an elevated risk of developing a C. difficile infection (CDI), namely clindamycin, fluoroquinolones and cephalosporins. The majority of infections are acquired outside of hospitals, and most antibiotics have similar elevated risk of infection on par with many non-antibiotic risk factors, such as using stool softeners and receiving an enema.

Clostridioides difficile can also become established in the human colon without causing disease. Although early estimates indicated that C. difficile was present in 2–5% of the adult population, more recent research indicates colonization is closely associated with a history of unrelated diarrheal illnesses, such as food poisoning or laxative abuse. Individuals with no history of gastrointestinal disturbances appear unlikely to become asymptomatic carriers. These carriers are thought to be a major reservoir of infection.

Taxonomy 
The species was transferred from the genus Clostridium to Clostridioides in 2016, thus giving it the binomial Clostridioides difficile. This new name reflects the taxonomic differences between this species and members of the genus Clostridium, while maintaining the common name as C. diff. , the only other species in this new genus is Clostridioides mangenotii (formerly known as Clostridium mangenotii).

Human pathogen 
Pathogenic C. difficile strains produce multiple toxins. The best-characterized are enterotoxin (C. difficile toxin A) and cytotoxin (C. difficile toxin B), both of which may produce diarrhea and inflammation in infected patients (C. difficile colitis), although their relative contributions have been debated. The diarrhea may range from a few days of intestinal fluid loss to life-threatening pseudomembranous colitis, which is associated with intense inflammation of the colon and formation of pseudomembranes on the intestinal mucosal surface. Toxins A and B are glucosyltransferases that target and inactivate the Rho family of GTPases. Toxin B (cytotoxin) induces actin depolymerization by a mechanism correlated with a decrease in the ADP-ribosylation of the low molecular mass GTP-binding Rho proteins. There is also a binary toxin (AB toxin), but its role in disease is not fully understood.

Additional virulence factors include an adhesion factor that mediates the binding to human colonic cells and a hyaluronidase. The bacterium also produces the chemical para-cresol, which inhibits the growth of other microbes in its vicinity and allows it to outcompete normal human gut flora.

Antibiotic treatment of C. diff infections may be difficult, due both to antibiotic resistance and physiological factors of the bacterium (spore formation, protective effects of the pseudomembrane). The emergence of a new, highly toxic strain of C. difficile, resistant to fluoroquinolone antibiotics, such as ciprofloxacin and levofloxacin, said to be causing geographically dispersed outbreaks in North America, was reported in 2005. The U.S. Centers for Disease Control in Atlanta warned of the emergence of an epidemic strain with increased virulence, antibiotic resistance, or both. Resistance to other antibiotics such as metronidazole, the first choice of antimicrobial drug when treating CDI, has been observed in up to 12% of clinical isolates, so as treatment with various antibiotics continues, more diverse and stronger resistances will continue to evolve in C. difficile populations, further complicating attempts at effective treatment.

Transmission
Clostridioides difficile is transmitted from person or animal to person by the fecal-oral route,  shed in faeces. The organism forms heat-resistant spores that are not killed by alcohol-based hand cleansers or routine surface cleaning, thus, these spores survive in clinical environments for long periods. Any surface, device, or material (e.g., toilets, bathing tubs, and electronic rectal thermometers) that becomes contaminated with faeces may serve as a reservoir for the C. difficile spores, and C. difficile spores can live for long periods of time on surfaces. Because of this, the bacterium may be cultured from almost any surface. Once spores are ingested, their acid resistance allows them to pass through the stomach unscathed. They germinate and multiply into vegetative cells in the colon upon exposure to bile acids. Consequently, the World Health Organization advocates the use of soap in addition to alcohol solutions to limit the spread of the spores. Sporulation was shown to be significantly reduced after inactivation of C. diffiicile's DNA methyltransferase CamA, raising the prospect of developing a drug that may inhibit this bacterium in a specific manner.

Susceptibility to colonization appears to be triggered by diarrheal illnesses, such as food poisoning or laxative abuse; people without a history of diarrheal illnesses who are exposed to C. difficile spores will not necessarily become carriers. Once people are colonized by C. difficile, they remain carriers for year-long time scales, but the day-to-day abundance of C. difficile fluctuates considerably - fluctuating from being below the limit of detection to high levels of shedding from one day to the next. GI disturbances in carriers appear to trigger periods of increased shedding which may be an important factor for transmission.

Host range 
Clostridioides difficile infects pigs, calves, and humans, and inhabits a natural reservoir of soil, faeces of domestic animals and humans, sewage, the human intestinal tract, and retail meat.

A 2015 CDC study estimated that C. diff afflicted almost half a million Americans and caused 29,000 deaths in 2011. The study estimated that 40% of cases began in nursing homes or community health-care settings, while 24% occurred in hospitals.

Clostridioides difficile is common in the human digestive system. However, it is a poor competitor, and is often outcompeted for nutrients by other bacteria in the digestive system. As a result, C. difficile is kept to a manageable number. If the sudden introduction of antibiotic disrupts the microbiome, C. difficile may be able to grow as a result of many of its competitors being killed off. The incubation period is 5–10 days, with a range of 1 day to weeks following antibiotic treatment for antibiotic associated diarrhea. Additionally, carriage of C. difficile with high levels of toxins is common in young children, while disease is rare. The production of one or even both toxins is not always sufficient for producing symptoms.

Signs and symptoms 
Symptoms of C. difficile infection include: diarrhea (at least three loose bowel movements a day), dehydration, abdominal pain that can be severe, loss of appetite, and nausea.

Host immune response 
The C. difficile secreted toxins A (TcdA) and B (TcdB), contain immunogenic antigens that are recognised by antibodies and T cells. However, the levels of anti-TcdA and -TcdB IgG antibodies have not been able to discriminate healthy individuals from patients with C. difficile infection, meaning they have limited clinical use. Recent work has shown these toxins are also recognised by helper CD4+ T cells, predominantly by the Th17 helper cells, which are important in maintaining a healthy gut environment, although in patients with severe infection these cells are impaired. Interestingly, individuals with severe C. difficile infection had significantly more toxin-specific T cells compared to those with mild infection, indicating T cells are playing a key role in fighting this infection. This is further evidenced by the recovery of the toxin-specific Th17 cells following Fecal microbiota transplant of patients with severe disease.

Treatment 
Patients being treated with antibiotics when symptoms begin should stop taking them, if possible. This break in antibiotic therapy can sometimes lead to spontaneous resolution of symptoms. Patients who do not respond to the cessation of broad-spectrum antibiotics will need to be treated with antibiotics capable of killing C. difficile spores. Primary infections are typically treated with vancomycin, with a usual dosage of 125 mg every 6 hours. The vancomycin regimen has replaced the traditional use of metronidazole due to its greater efficacy, safety profile, and lower recurrence rates. In patients who cannot tolerate vancomycin, fidaxomicin is an acceptable option with similar efficacy and even lower recurrence rates than vancomycin. In cases of fulminant CDI, adjuvant therapy with parenteral metronidazole plus oral vancomycin or fidaxomicin is suggested.

About 20% of patients who successfully complete therapy of primary infection with metronidazole or vancomycin will experience a relapse. A fraction of those patients will experience continuous reoccurrences of the infection. The first relapse of C. difficile is usually treated with the same antibiotic used to treat the primary infection. Any subsequent infections should not be treated with metronidazole. Occasionally, a standard 10-day course of oral vancomycin will not work. In these cases, a vancomycin taper is the preferred treatment. Patients take decreasing doses of vancomycin over a period of up to 3 months, depending on the severity of the infection.

Each subsequent relapse of C. difficile tends to be more severe than previous infections. Long-term treatment with a vancomycin taper supplemented with probiotics, especially Saccharomyces boulardii, is associated with a higher rate of success.

After three relapses, patients may be treated with oral fidaxomicin, a narrow-spectrum antibiotic. The usual dosage is 200 mg twice a day orally for 10 days. Fidaxomicin is considered to be superior to vancomycin for severe CDI. The major downside of treatment with fidaxomicin is the cost of medication. A 10-day course may cost up to US$3500.

Patients who do not respond to traditional antibiotic therapy may be eligible for a Fecal microbiota transplant (FMT). Healthcare providers can transfer stool from a healthy person to the colon of a patient with repeated CDI. This process is the most successful treatment for severe CDI with a cure rate around 93%. Recurrence rates of CDI in patients treated with a FMT are generally low, around 19%, which makes it very effective at treating chronic CDI cases. However, in some cases, flares of inflammatory bowel disease are a possible side effect of the treatment. Long-term effects of FMT are unknown, as the procedure has only been FDA approved since 2011 and relatively few procedures have been performed. If transplantation is not an option, removal of the infected part of the colon can cure CDI.

Strains 
In 2005, molecular analysis led to the identification of the C. difficile strain type characterized as group BI by restriction endonuclease analysis, as North American pulse-field-type NAP1 by pulsed-field gel electrophoresis  and as ribotype 027; the differing terminology reflects the predominant techniques used for epidemiological typing. This strain is referred to as C. difficile BI/NAP1/027.

As of 2016, the NAP1 strain has been replaced by novel strains in some areas of British Columbia. These novel strains include NAP2 and NAP4, and some strains that do not have a NAP designation. The frequency of these novel strains increased from 2008 to 2013 in one studied region, displacing the originally more common and recognizable NAP1 bacteria.

Two strains, ribotypes RT078 and RT027, can live on low concentrations of the sugar trehalose; both strains became more common after trehalose was introduced as a food additive in the early 2000s, thus increasing dietary trehalose intake.

Genome 

The first complete genome sequence of a C. difficile strain was published in 2005 by Sanger Institute in the UK. This was of the strain 630, a virulent and multiple drug-resistant strain isolated in Switzerland in 1982. Scientists at Sanger Institute have sequenced genomes of about 30 C. difficile isolates using next-generation sequencing technologies from 454 Life Sciences and Illumina.

Researchers at McGill University in Montreal sequenced the genome of the highly virulent Quebec strain of C. difficile in 2005 using ultra-high throughput sequencing technology. The tests involved doing 400,000 DNA parallel-sequencing reactions of the bacterium's genome, which had been fragmented for sequencing. These sequences were assembled computationally to form a complete genome sequence.

In 2012, scientists at University of Oxford sequenced C. difficile genomes from 486 cases arising over four years in Oxfordshire using next-generation sequencing technologies from Illumina.

Epigenome 
Clostridioides difficile has a highly diverse epigenome, with 17 high-quality methylation motifs reported so far, the majority pertaining to the 6mA type. Methylation at one of these motifs - CAAAAA, was shown to impact sporulation, a key step in C. difficile disease transmission, as well as cell length, biofilm formation, and host colonization.

Bacteriophage 
At least eight mainly temperate bacteriophages have been isolated from C. difficile, ranging in genome size from about 30 to about 60 kbp. Both environmentally and clinically derived C. difficile strains carry a diverse and prevalent set of prophages.

Etymology and pronunciation

References

External links
 Pathogen Safety Data Sheets: Infectious Substances – Clostridium Difficile, Public Health Agency, Canada, 10 September 2014.
 Type strain of Clostridium difficile, BacDive - the Bacterial Diversity Metadatabase.

Antibiotic-resistant bacteria
Peptostreptococcaceae
Gram-positive bacteria
Medically important anaerobes
Bacteria described in 1935